Bobo, Mississippi may refer to:
Bobo, Coahoma County, Mississippi, an unincorporated community in Coahoma County, Mississippi
Bobo, Quitman County, Mississippi, an unincorporated community in Quitman County, Mississippi